is a Japanese tarento, gravure idol and race queen. In addition, she has released several music CDs, mostly containing cover versions. She also worked for professional wrestling promotion Hustle in 2006, making her debut on September 7 along with fellow tarento Hitomi Kaikawa.

Works

DVDs 
 [2003.03.25] Strawberry
 [2004.07.23] Lolita Race Queen
 [2004.09.15] Endless 2004
 [2004.09.24] Silky Collection ~Se-Onna!~ Hamada Shouko
 [2004.11.26] Race Queen no Joshintachi Hamada Shouko
 [2005.01.26] Idol Complete 2005 Winter Blue
 [2005.02.25] Love! Hamasho

Photobooks 
 [2004.07.23] Lolita Race Queen

Music CDs 
 [2006.11.8] Cosplay Trance Utaemashoko!
 [2007.3.21] Cosplay Trance Odorimashoko!
 [2007.7.18] Hamatra Moriagarimashoko!
 [2007.10.3] Hamasho Album Oteate Shimashoko!
 [2008.3.26] Jaa Ne (cover version of the Onyanko Club song)

TV Dramas 
 [2006.4.27~2006.6.22] Shinigami no Ballad 1-6

Games 
 Hamada appears on a poster in Metal Gear Solid 3: Snake Eater, at the Locker Room in the Eastern Weapons Wing of Groznyj Grad.

References

Living people
1986 births
People from Kyoto
Japanese gravure models
Japanese female idols
Musicians from Kyoto Prefecture